Lomatium rigidum is a species of flowering plant in the carrot family known by the common names Big Pine biscuitroot and stiff lomatium. It is endemic to Inyo County, California, where it is known only from the wilderness around the Big Pine area of the Owens Valley.

Description
Lomatium rigidum is a perennial herb growing up to about half a meter-1.5 feet tall from a large taproot. There is generally no stem, the leaves and inflorescence emerging at ground level. The hairless gray-green leaf blades are made up of several sharp-toothed, fleshy segments. The inflorescence is a webbed umbel of tiny yellow flowers.

External links
Jepson Manual Treatment - Lomatium rigidum
USDA Plants Profile; Lomatium rigidum
Lomatium rigidum - Photo gallery

rigidum
Endemic flora of California
Natural history of Inyo County, California
Flora without expected TNC conservation status